The Utah Central Railway  is a shortline railroad serving Ogden, Utah and surrounding areas. It interchanges with the Union Pacific Railroad (UP), as well as with BNSF Railway trains running over the UP via trackage rights. The company began operations in 1992 as a private switching railroad, and became a common carrier in 1995. It expanded operations in 2001 and 2004, and the Patriot Rail Corporation gained control in January 2008.

History
UCRY's first operations, which began in September 1992, were under contract to Westinghouse Electric, switching cars at the Western Zirconium Plant west of Ogden for interchange with UP and the Denver and Rio Grande Western Railroad (by then operating as a subsidiary of the Southern Pacific). In October 1995 it began common carrier service on industrial trackage in Ogden, which it acquired from the city. Here too it interchanged with both the UP and Southern Pacific, the former on its old line next to Midland Drive. In 2001, UCRY leased a number of Ogden-area branch lines from the UP, which had absorbed the Southern Pacific; this included the remnants of the old UP and Rio Grande main lines west of downtown Ogden. Finally, in 2004, UCRY acquired the trackage serving Business Depot Ogden from a UP connection.

At one point the UCRY leased a 44-ton GE diesel and class CA-11 caboose from the Utah State Railroad Museum in Ogden, Utah. Both the locomotive and caboose were repainted in UCRY colors. When returned to the museum, the locomotive sat idle for several years. 

For many years, the Business Depot was served by an ex-Air Force Fairbanks-Morse H-12-44. In July 2010, the UCRY repainted their ex-Rarus Railway GP9 black with a large "Utah Central" in gold across the engine compartment, and moved it to BDO to replace the FM locomotive. Reason for this replacement is unknown; according to a Utah Central employee, the H-12-44 had only 100 running hours in 2009.

In September 2010, two GP-15 diesel locomotives 1418 and 1401, refurbished from LTEX were delivered to the UCRY's headquarters at the old sugar factory. They are painted in the distinctive Patriot Rail corporate scheme (red overall with a blue stripe highlighted by gold pin stripes down the middle with an eagle on the nose).

Locomotives
The Utah Central was once known for its eclectic mix of second-hand locomotives. For a time no two were painted alike (excepting nos. 1418 and 1401). Some notable former examples of this are an ex-Kennecott High-Clearance GP-39 locomotive originally used in the Bingham Canyon copper pit (RARW 1010) and an ex-Rarus Railway chop-nose GP9 (UCRY 201). Currently most of the Utah Central locomotive fleet is painted in the colors of its parent Patriot Rail.

References

External links

Utah Central Railway

Utah railroads
Railway companies established in 1992
Patriot Rail Company